Moransengo-Tonengo is a comune (municipality) in the Province of Asti in the Italian region Piedmont, located at about 430 meters above sea level on the Monferrato hills. It was established on 1 January 2023 with the merger of Moransengo and Tonengo. The seat of the municipality is in Tonengo.

Moransengo-Tonengo borders the following municipalities: Brozolo, Brusasco, Cavagnolo, and Cocconato.

References

Cities and towns in Piedmont
2023 establishments in Italy